The Las Vegas Aces are an American professional basketball team based in the Las Vegas metropolitan area. The Aces compete in the Women's National Basketball Association (WNBA) as a member club of the league's Western Conference. The team plays their home games at Michelob Ultra Arena in the Mandalay Bay Resort and Casino. The Aces won the 2022 WNBA Commissioner’s Cup and WNBA Championship.

The team was founded in Salt Lake City, Utah, as the Utah Starzz before the league's inaugural 1997 season. It then moved to San Antonio, Texas before the 2003 season and became the San Antonio Silver Stars, later shortened to the San Antonio Stars in 2014. The team relocated to Las Vegas before the 2018 season. The Aces, who are owned by Mark Davis, the current owner of the NFL's Las Vegas Raiders, are one of three WNBA franchises who compete in a market that lacks a current NBA team; the other two teams are the Connecticut Sun and the Seattle Storm.

As the Stars, the team qualified for the WNBA Playoffs in seven of their fifteen years in San Antonio. The franchise has been home to many high-quality players such as all-star point guard Becky Hammon, solid power-forward Sophia Young, former first-overall draft pick Ann Wauters, seven-foot-two-inch center Margo Dydek, two-time Sixth Woman of the Year Dearica Hamby, and two-time league M’VP A'ja Wilson. The franchise has gone to the WNBA Finals three times: first in 2008, losing to Detroit, in 2020 losing to Seattle, and in 2022 winning against Connecticut.

Franchise history

The Utah Starzz years (1997–2002)

One of the eight original WNBA teams, the Utah Starzz (partially named after the old ABA team, the Utah Stars, but with the zz at the end like the Utah Jazz) never met the same success as their (former) counterpart in the NBA, the Utah Jazz. They held the distinction of having the worst record in the WNBA in 1997 and were the first team to select in the 1998 WNBA Draft. With their selection, they picked 7 ft. 2 in. center Margo Dydek, who easily became the tallest player in WNBA history. Unfortunately, the pickup of Dydek did little to help their cause and they again finished near the bottom of the league in the 1998 & 1999 seasons. The Starzz finally posted a winning record in 2000, but did not make the playoffs. In 2001, the Utah Starzz made it to the playoffs for the first time, but they were quickly swept in the first round by the Sacramento Monarchs. In 2002, the Starzz made it to the playoffs again, and this time beat the Houston Comets in the Western Conference Semifinals 2 games to 1. Their playoff run ended in the Western Finals, however, as they were swept aside by the eventual champs, the Los Angeles Sparks.

The San Antonio Silver Stars/Stars years (2002–2017)

When the NBA divested itself of all of its WNBA franchises at the end of the 2002 season, the Utah Jazz ownership did not wish to retain ownership of the Starzz. The Starzz then looked for local Utah potential buyers, but none were found, leaving the franchise with the choices of either being sold to out-of-town investor(s) or folding. The Starzz avoided folding when the franchise was sold to Peter Holt (the owner of the NBA's San Antonio Spurs) and relocated to San Antonio. The team's name was changed to the San Antonio Silver Stars and would change its team colors to the silver and black motif used by the Spurs.

For the first four seasons (2003–2006) after moving to San Antonio, the franchise was unable to change its old losing trend and did not make the playoffs. The 2007 season brought a lot of change for the Silver Stars. They acquired stars Becky Hammon, Ruth Riley, and Sandora Irvin in trades, selected Helen Darling in Charlotte Sting's dispersal draft, drafted Camille Little in the second round, signed Erin Buescher during the off-season, and retained key players, such as Marie Ferdinand-Harris, Vickie Johnson, Shanna Crossley, Kendra Wecker, and Sophia Young. The new-look Silver Stars became an instant contender in the Western Conference. On August 4, 2007 the Silver Stars clinched their first playoff berth since the franchise relocated to San Antonio in 2003. In the first round, the Silver Stars were matched up against the Sacramento Monarchs. After losing game 1 in Sacramento, the Silver Stars would win games 2 and 3 to advance to the Western Finals. The Silver Stars faced off against a strong Phoenix Mercury team, which had the number 1 seed in the Western Conference. On September 1, 2007 the Silver Stars' season came to an end after the Stars lost Game 2 98–92 in Phoenix.

Heading into 2008, the Silver Stars were regarded as a premiere contender and did not disappoint. After an average start, the Stars seized control of the Western Conference and rode to the best record in the West, and the #1 seed in the playoffs. In the WNBA Finals, the Silver Stars faced the Detroit Shock, who were making their third WNBA Finals appearance in a row. In Game 1 at home, the Silver Stars fell behind early, but would tie the game at 69 with 2:15 left in the 4th quarter. But from there the Shock took control once again and won the game 77–69. The 2010 season was not much different for the Stars. They finished with an unimpressive 14–20 record but sneaked into the third seed of the playoffs in a below-average Western Conference. The Silver Stars were swept in the first round of the playoffs by Phoenix and it was clear that some changes were needed. In the 2012 playoffs, the Silver Stars lost in the first round to the Los Angeles Sparks. The team would miss the playoffs in 2013. In the 2014 playoffs, the Stars would lose in the first round to the Minnesota Lynx.

Relocation to Las Vegas
After the Spurs Sports & Entertainment decided to put the team up for sale, following the 2017 season, it became apparent the team would be on the move. The NBA and WNBA approved the sale of the Stars to MGM Resorts on October 17, 2017, with the intention of relocating the team to Las Vegas and playing at the Michelob Ultra Arena starting in the 2018 season. On December 11, 2017, at a press conference inside the House of Blues at Mandalay Bay in Las Vegas, the team name was officially announced as the Las Vegas Aces. They received the first pick in the 2018 WNBA Draft, and picked South Carolina's A'ja Wilson. On January 14, 2021, Mark Davis, owner of the Las Vegas Raiders agreed to purchase the team from MGM. The purchase was approved by the league on February 12, 2021. Shortly after the purchase of the team by Davis, ground was broken on a training facility for the Aces in Henderson next to the Raiders facility. The 50,000 square foot facility will house the Aces’ practice facility, offices, training room, weight room, hydrotherapy space, physical therapy area, locker rooms, a lecture hall, player and alumni lounges, and an on-site day care center and is expected to be completed by March 2023. In May 2021, Davis hired former LSU Lady Tigers basketball head coach Nikki Fargas as team president. On December 31, 2021, Becky Hammon was hired as head coach in a deal that made her the highest paid coach in the WNBA. During the 2022 season, the Aces defeated the Phoenix Mercury in round 1 and the Seattle Storm in the semifinals before deafeating the Connecticut Sun in the 2022 WNBA Finals in 4 games to win the franchise's first championship and the first professional sports championship for Las Vegas.

Season-by-season records

Players

Current roster

Former players
Danielle Adams (2011–2015)
Chantelle Anderson (2005–2007)
Jayne Appel (2010–2016)
Jennifer Azzi (2000–2003)
Elena Baranova (1997–1999)
Helen Darling (2007–2010)
Margo Dydek (1998–2004)
Shyra Ely (2005–2006)
Marie Ferdinand-Harris (2001–2007)
Adrienne Goodson (1999–2004) 
Becky Hammon (2007–2014), now head coach of the Las Vegas Aces
Dena Head (1997–1998)
Chamique Holdsclaw (2010)
Shannon "Pee Wee" Johnson (2004–2006)
Shenise Johnson (2012-2014)
Vickie Johnson (2006–2009), now the head coach for the Dallas Wings
Kayla McBride (2014–2020), now a member of the Minnesota Lynx
DeLisha Milton-Jones (2013), now the head coach for the Old Dominion University women's basketball team
Wendy Palmer-Daniel (1997–1999, 2005)
Jia Perkins (2011–2015)
Erin Buescher Perperoglou (2007–2009)
Semeka Randall (2002–2004)
Ruth Riley (2007–2011)
Danielle Robinson (2011–2016, 2020), now a member of the Indiana Fever
Sugar Rodgers (2019–2020), now an assistant coach for the Aces.
Olympia Scott (1998–1999)
Michelle Snow (2010)
Kate Starbird (2000–2002)
LaToya Thomas (2004–2006)
Ann Wauters (2008–2009)
Natalie Williams (1999–2002)
Sophia Young (2006–2015)
Shanna Zolman (2006–2007, 2009)
Tausha Mills (2003)

Retired numbers

Notes

Coaches and staff

Owners
 Larry H. Miller, owner of the Utah Jazz (1997–2002)
 Peter Holt, owner of the San Antonio Spurs (2003–2017)
 MGM Resorts International (2017–2021)
 Mark Davis (2021–present)

Head coaches

General managers
Jay Francis (1997–2004)
Dan Hughes (2005–2015)
Ruth Riley (2016–2017)
Bill Laimbeer (2018)
Dan Padover (2019–2021)
Natalie Williams (2022–Present)

Assistant coaches
Greg Williams (1997)
Fred Williams (1998)
Michael Layden (1999)
Candi Harvey (1999–2000)
Richard Smith (1999–2000)
Tammy Reiss (2001–2003)
Bobby Morse (2002)
Shell Dailey (2003–2004)
Vonn Read (2004)
Brian Agler (2005–2007)
Sandy Brondello (2005–2009)
Vanessa Nygaard (2008, 2021)
Olaf Lange (2008–2010)
Vickie Johnson (2011–2016, 2018–2020)
Steve Shuman (2011–2012)
James Wade (2013–2016)
Joi Williams (2017)
Latricia Trammell (2017)
Kelly Schumacher (2018–2020)
Tanisha Wright (2020–2021)
Sugar Rodgers (2021)
Natalie Nakase (2022–Present)
Tyler Marsh (2022–Present)
Charlene Thomas-Swinson (2022–Present)

Statistics

Media coverage
All non nationally televised Aces games are broadcast locally on the second digital subchannel of KVVU, which is branded as the Silver State Sports and Entertainment Network. KVVU also broadcasts a 30 minute weekly show on the Aces.

All games (excluding blackout games, which are available on ESPN3.com) are broadcast to the WNBA LiveAccess game feeds on the league website. Furthermore, some Aces games are broadcast nationally on ESPN, ESPN2, ABC, and the CBS Sports Network. The WNBA reached an eight-year agreement with ESPN, which pays rights fees to the Aces, as well as other teams in the league.

On radio, Aces games are broadcast locally on KWWN ESPN Las Vegas.

All-time notes

Regular season attendance
A sellout for a basketball game at Delta Center (Utah) is 19,911.
A sellout for a basketball game at AT&T Center (San Antonio) (2003–2014, 2016–2017) is 18,418.
A sellout for a basketball game at Freeman Coliseum (San Antonio) (2015) is 9,800.
A sellout for a basketball game at Michelob Ultra Arena (Las Vegas) (2018–present) is 12,000.

Draft picks
1997 Elite: Dena Head (1), Wendy Palmer (9)
1997: Tammi Reiss (5), Jessie Hicks (12), Reagan Scott (21), Kim Williams (28)
1998: Margo Dydek (1), Olympia Scott (11), LaTonya Johnson (21), Tricia Bader (31)
1999: Natalie Williams (3), Debbie Black (15), Adrienne Goodson (27), Dalma Ivanyi (39)
2000: Naomi Mulitauaopele (12), Stacy Frese (35), Kristen Rasmussen (51)
2001: Marie Ferdinand (8), Michaela Pavlickova (24), Shea Ralph (40), Cara Conseugra (56)
2002: Danielle Crockrom (11), LaNeishea Caufield (14), Andrea Gardner (27), Edmarie Lumbsley (43), Jacklyn Winfield (59)
2003 Miami/Portland Dispersal Draft: LaQuanda Barksdale (12)
2003: Coretta Brown (11), Ke-Ke Tardy (25), Brooke Armistead (40)
2004 Cleveland Dispersal Draft: LaToya Thomas (3)
2004: Cindy Dallas (21), Toccara Williams (34)
2005: Kendra Wecker (4), Shyra Ely (14), Catherine Kraayeveld (27)
2006: Sophia Young (4), Shanna Crossley (16), Khara Smith (30)
2007 Charlotte Dispersal Draft: Helen Darling (4)
2007: Camille Little (17), Nare Diawara (30)
2008: Chioma Nnamaka (21), Alex Anderson (39)
2009 Houston Dispersal Draft: selection waived
2009: Megan Frazee (14), Sonja Petrovic (26), Candyce Bingham (39)
2010 Sacramento Dispersal Draft: Laura Harper (5)
2010: Jayne Appel (5), Alysha Clark (17), Alexis Rack (29)
2011: Danielle Robinson (6), Danielle Adams (20), Porsha Phillips (30)
2012: Shenise Johnson (5)
2013: Kayla Alexander (8), Davellyn Whyte (16), Diandra Tchatchouang (20), Whitney Hand (32)
2014: Kayla McBride (3), Astou Ndour (16), Bri Kulas (28)
2015: Dearica Hamby (6), Dragana Stanković (30), Nikki Moody (33)
2016: Moriah Jefferson (2), Brittney Martin (25)
2017: Kelsey Plum (1), Nia Coffey (5), Schaquilla Nunn (25)
2018: A'ja Wilson (1), Jaime Nared (13), Raigyne Louis (25), Jill Barta (32)
2019: Jackie Young (1)
2020: Lauren Manis (33)
2021: Iliana Rupert (12), Destiny Slocum (14), Kionna Jeter (36)
2022: Mya Hollingshed (8), Kierstan Bell (11), Kayla Pointer (13), Aisha Sheppard (23), Faustine Aifuwa (35)

Trades
May 5, 1998: The Starzz traded Lady Harmon to the Sacramento Monarchs in exchange for Chantel Tremitiere.
May 8, 1998: The Starzz traded Karen Booker to the Houston Comets in exchange for Fran Harris.
July 29, 1999: The Starzz traded Wendy Palmer and Olympia Scott-Richardson to the Detroit Shock in exchange for Korie Hlede and Cindy Brown.
April 24, 2000: The Starzz traded the third and eighth picks in the 2000 Draft to the Detroit Shock in exchange for Jennifer Azzi and the 12th pick in the 2000 Draft.
April 18, 2002: The Starzz traded Korie Hlede to the New York Liberty in exchange for the 14th pick in the 2002 Draft.
January 28, 2004: The Silver Stars traded the fourth, 16th, and 29th picks in the 2004 Draft to the Connecticut Sun in exchange for Shannon Johnson, the 21st and the 34th picks in the 2004 Draft.
July 19, 2004: The Silver Stars traded Gwen Jackson to the Phoenix Mercury in exchange for Adrian Williams.
April 16, 2005: The Silver Stars traded Margo Dydek to the Connecticut Sun in exchange for Katie Feenstra and a first-round pick in the 2006 Draft.
May 18, 2005: The Silver Stars traded Connecticut's first-round pick in the 2006 Draft to the Sacramento Monarchs in exchange for Chantelle Anderson.
February 21, 2007: The Silver Stars traded a second-round pick in the 2007 Draft to the Phoenix Mercury in exchange for Sandora Irvin.
February 22, 2007: The Silver Stars traded Katie Feenstra and the right to swap first-round picks in the 2008 Draft to the Detroit Shock in exchange for Ruth Riley.
April 4, 2007: The Silver Stars traded Jessica Davenport and a first-round pick in the 2008 Draft to the New York Liberty in exchange for Becky Hammon and a second-round pick in the 2008 Draft.
April 9, 2008: The Silver Stars traded Camille Little, Chioma Nnamaka, and a first-round pick in the 2009 Draft to the Atlanta Dream in exchange for Ann Wauters, Morenike Atunrase, and a second-round pick in the 2009 Draft.
February 19, 2010: The Silver Stars acquired Roneeka Hodges from the Minnesota Lynx in exchange for the right to swap second-round picks in the 2011 Draft.
March 11, 2010: The Silver Stars acquired Michelle Snow from the Atlanta Dream in exchange for Dalma Ivanyi and the right to swap second-round picks in the 2011 Draft.
April 14, 2010: The Silver Stars traded Shanna Crossley to the Tulsa Shock in exchange for Crystal Kelly.
April 20, 2011: The Silver Stars traded Michelle Snow to the Chicago Sky in exchange for Jia Perkins.
May 2, 2011: The Silver Stars traded second- and third-round picks in the 2012 Draft to the Tulsa Shock in exchange for Scholanda Robinson.
March 1, 2012: The Silver Stars traded Roneeka Hodges to the Indiana Fever in exchange for Tangela Smith.
March 14, 2012: The Silver Stars traded Sonja Petrovic to the Chicago Sky in exchange for a third-round pick in the 2013 Draft.
March 12, 2015: The Stars traded Shenise Johnson and a second-round pick in the 2015 Draft to the Indiana Fever in exchange for a first- and third-round picks in the 2015 Draft.
April 16, 2015: The Stars traded the 9th overall pick in the 2015 Draft to the New York Liberty in exchange for Alex Montgomery.
July 5, 2015: The Stars traded a second-round pick in the 2016 Draft to the Atlanta Dream in exchange for Samantha Logic.
April 14, 2016: The Stars traded Jia Perkins to the Minnesota Lynx in exchange for Jazmon Gwathmey.
May 9, 2016: The Stars traded a second-round pick in the 2017 Draft to the Phoenix Mercury in exchange for Monique Currie.
January 31, 2017: The Stars traded Danielle Robinson to the Phoenix Mercury in exchange for Isabelle Harrison and the 5th pick in the 2017 Draft.
February 27, 2017: The Stars traded Astou Ndour to the Chicago Sky in exchange for Clarissa Dos Santos.
May 9, 2017: The Stars traded Jazmon Gwathmey to the Indiana Fever in exchange for the Fever's 2018 3rd round pick.
June 28, 2017: The Stars traded Monique Currie to Phoenix Mercury for Shay Murphy, Sophie Brunner and Mercury's 2018 3rd Round Draft Pick.
February 1, 2018: The Aces traded Kayla Alexander and their 3rd round pick in the 2019 Draft to Indiana Fever for their 2nd round pick in 2019 Draft.
February 2, 2018: The Aces traded the 26th pick in the 2018 Draft and their 2nd round pick in the 2019 Draft to Phoenix Mercury for Kelsey Bone.
May 16, 2019: The Aces traded Moriah Jefferson, Isabelle Harrison, their first and second round picks in the 2020 Draft to the Dallas Wings in exchange for Liz Cambage.
February 15, 2021: The Aces traded Lindsay Allen and the 24th pick in the 2021 Draft to Indiana for the 14th pick in the 2021 Draft.
April 10, 2022: The Aces traded their first and second round picks in the 2023 Draft to Minnesota for the 8th and 13th pick in the 2022 Draft.

All-Stars
1997: No All-Star Game
1998: No All-Star Game
1999: Natalie Williams
2000: Natalie Williams
2001: Natalie Williams
2002: Marie Ferdinand-Harris, Adrienne Goodson
2003: Margo Dydek, Marie Ferdinand-Harris
2004: Shannon Johnson
2005: Marie Ferdinand-Harris
2006: Sophia Young
2007: Becky Hammon, Sophia Young
2008: No All-Star Game
2009: Becky Hammon, Sophia Young
2010: Jayne Appel, Becky Hammon, Michelle Snow, Sophia Young
2011: Danielle Adams, Becky Hammon
2012: No All-Star Game
2013: Danielle Robinson
2014: Danielle Robinson
2015: Kayla McBride, Danielle Robinson
2016: No All-Star Game
2018: Kayla McBride, A'ja Wilson
2019: Liz Cambage, Kayla McBride, A'ja Wilson
2020: No All-Star Game
2021: Liz Cambage, Chelsea Gray, Dearica Hamby, A'ja Wilson
2022: Dearica Hamby, Kelsey Plum, A'ja Wilson, Jackie Young

Olympians
2000: Natalie Williams, Margo Dydek (POL)
2004: Shannon Johnson
2008: Becky Hammon (RUS)
2012: Becky Hammon (RUS)
2016: Astou Ndour (ESP)
2020: Chelsea Gray, A'ja Wilson, Kelsey Plum, Jackie Young, Ji-Su Park (ROK)

Honors and awards

1997 All-WNBA Second Team: Wendy Palmer
1999 All-WNBA First Team: Natalie Williams
2000 All-WNBA First Team: Natalie Williams
2000 Peak Performer (FT%): Jennifer Azzi
2001 All-WNBA First Team: Natalie Williams
2005 All-Rookie Team: Katie Feenstra
2006 All-Rookie Team: Sophia Young
2007 All-WNBA First Team: Becky Hammon
2007 All-WNBA Second Team: Sophia Young
2007 All-Rookie Team: Camille Little
2007 Coach of the Year: Dan Hughes
2007 Peak Performer (Assists): Becky Hammon
2008 All-WNBA First Team: Sophia Young
2008 All-WNBA Second Team: Becky Hammon
2008 All-Defensive First Team: Sophia Young
2008 Kim Perrot Sportsmanship Award: Vickie Johnson
2009 All-WNBA First Team: Becky Hammon
2009 All-WNBA Second Team: Sophia Young
2011 Kim Perrot Sportsmanship Award: Ruth Riley
2011 All-Rookie Team: Danielle Adams
2011 All-Rookie Team: Danielle Robinson
2012 All-WNBA Second Team: Sophia Young
2012 All-Defensive Second Team: Danielle Robinson
2012 All-Defensive Second Team: Sophia Young
2013 Peak Performer (Assists): Danielle Robinson
2013 All-Defensive Second Team: Jia Perkins
2013 All-Defensive Second Team: Danielle Robinson
2014 Kim Perrot Sportsmanship Award: Becky Hammon
2014 All-WNBA Second Team: Danielle Robinson
2014 All-Defensive Second Team: Danielle Robinson
2014 All-Rookie Team: Kayla McBride
2016 All-Rookie Team: Moriah Jefferson
2017 All-Rookie Team: Kelsey Plum
2018 Rookie of the Year: A'ja Wilson
2019 Sixth Woman of the Year: Dearica Hamby
2019 All-WNBA Second Team: Liz Cambage
2020 Most Valuable Player: A'ja Wilson
2020 Sixth Woman of the Year: Dearica Hamby
2020 Executive of the Year: Dan Padover
2020 All-Defensive Second Team: A'ja Wilson
2020 All-WNBA First Team: A'ja Wilson
2021 Sixth Woman of the Year: Kelsey Plum
2021 Basketball Executive of the Year: Dan Padover
2021 All-WNBA Second Team: A'ja Wilson
2022 Defensive Player of the Year: A'ja Wilson
2022 Most Valuable Player: A'ja Wilson
2022 All-WNBA First Team: A'ja Wilson
2022 Most Improved Player: Jackie Young
2022 All-WNBA First Team: Kelsey Plum
2022 Finals MVP: Chelsea Gray
2022 Coach of the Year: Becky Hammon

Notes

References

External links

 

 
Women's National Basketball Association teams
Basketball teams established in 1997
Sports teams in Las Vegas
Basketball teams in Nevada
1997 establishments in Utah
Relocated Women's National Basketball Association teams